Zaw Myo Tin is a Burmese politician and current chief minister of Kayah State. He is a retired Lieutenant general of Tatmadaw. He served as a MP of Kayah State Hluttaw, minister of Security and Border Affairs of Kayah State, Commander of Regional Operations Commands (Loikaw), Commander of Naypyitaw Regional Command and Chief of Armed Forces Training.

Career

Early life
He attended to Defence Services Academy as part of the 32nd intake.

Military career
In 2013, he was appointed as Minister of Security and Border Affairs of Kayah State in Khin Maung Oo's first cabinet. He was reappointed as minister in L Phaung Sho's cabinet. In 2017, he was promoted as Brigadier General and became the commander of Regional Operation Command (Loikaw) under the Eastern Regional Command.

Later, he moved to the Office of the Commander in chief of Defence Services in Naypyitaw with the rank Major General. In January 2021, he was appointed as the Commander of the Naypyitaw Regional Command. In September 2021 he was promoted as Lieutenant General and became the chief of Armed Forces Training.

Chief minister
In January 2022, the conflict between Tatmadaw and local defence forces in Kayah State forcing residents Loikaw district to flee. On 31 January 2022, the incumbent chief minister Khin Maung Oo was dimissied.  Zaw Myo Tin retired from his military post and became the head of Kayah State Government on 1 February 2022.

References

Living people
Year of birth missing (living people)
Burmese military personnel
Burmese soldiers
Government ministers of Myanmar
Region or state chief ministers of Myanmar
Defence Services Academy alumni